Donald Allen Dewsbury (born 1939) is an American comparative psychologist and historian of psychology. He is Emeritus Professor of Psychology at the University of Florida. Much of his research has focused on the history of psychology, particularly comparative and experimental psychology. He has also conducted research on animal behavior, and served as president of the Animal Behavior Society, as well as of three divisions of the American Psychological Association. In 2017, he received a Presidential Citation from the American Psychological Association.

References

External links
Faculty page

Living people
1939 births
Bucknell University alumni
University of Michigan alumni
University of Florida faculty
21st-century American psychologists
Comparative psychologists
Historians of psychology
20th-century American historians
American male non-fiction writers
American historians of science
20th-century American male writers
20th-century American psychologists